Hosam Abdallah (حسام عبد الله; born 8 September 1966) is an Egyptian handball player. He competed for Egypt's national team at the 1992 and 1996 Summer Olympics.

References

1966 births
Living people
Egyptian male handball players
Handball players at the 1992 Summer Olympics
Handball players at the 1996 Summer Olympics
Olympic handball players of Egypt
20th-century Egyptian people